Business Stream is a water retail business operating in both Scotland and England's competitive non-domestic water markets, with its headquarters in Edinburgh. It also has offices in Glasgow, Worthing and Bradford. The company is a subsidiary of Scottish Water, the publicly owned utility which serves the residential water market across Scotland.

Operation in Scotland

Having previously supplied all of Scotland’s properties with water, Scottish Water split its non-domestic arm off to serve the fledgling market. The newly formed company, called Business Stream, acted as the incumbent non-domestic water and waste water supplier for organisations in the country.

In June 2020, Business Stream reported that since the market opened in 2008, it has helped its customers save over £272 million through discounts and water and energy efficiencies.

Operations in England

On 8 December 2011, the Department for Environment, Food and Rural Affairs (DEFRA) published the Water for life market reform proposals, which suggested the introduction of competition to England’s non-residential water market.

Business Stream registered for a licence to compete in the English market, as reported in the Sunday Times in 2009. It has since stated that it has secured contracts with Network Rail, Cancer Research UK, Lloyds Banking Group and the Ministry of Justice.

References 

Companies based in Edinburgh
Renewable resource companies established in 2006
Water companies of the United Kingdom
Water management
2006 establishments in Scotland